Vilho Heikki Kivioja (21 January 1896 – 2 November 1977) was a Finnish Lutheran clergyman and politician, born in Kalajoki. He was a member of the Parliament of Finland from 1929 to 1945, representing the Agrarian League. Anna-Maja Henriksson is his granddaughter.

References

1896 births
1977 deaths
People from Kalajoki
People from Oulu Province (Grand Duchy of Finland)
20th-century Finnish Lutheran clergy
Centre Party (Finland) politicians
Members of the Parliament of Finland (1929–30)
Members of the Parliament of Finland (1930–33)
Members of the Parliament of Finland (1933–36)
Members of the Parliament of Finland (1936–39)
Members of the Parliament of Finland (1939–45)
Finnish people of World War II
University of Helsinki alumni